The Black Spring (Kabyle: Tafsut Taberkant) was a series of protests and political demonstrations by Kabyle activists in the Kabylie region of Algeria in 2001, which were met by repressive and violent police measures and became a potent symbol of Kabyle discontent with the national government. The protests took place against a backdrop of long-standing cultural marginalization of the Highlander Kabyle, a homogeneous Berber linguistic group in Algeria (Berber speakers form some 25%–35% of the total population, although exact numbers are disputed) despite the most rigid government-sponsored Arabization measures of the 1960s through the 1980s having been lifted. The name "Black Spring" alludes to the events known as the Berber Spring of the 1980s, in which mainly Kabyle civil society activists challenged the ban on Berber culture then in place, demanding cultural rights and democracy.

Events
In 2001, a young Kabyle student, Massinissa Guermah, was arrested by Algerian gendarmes and later died inside the gendarmerie. This provoked large-scale riots in the Kabyle region, that lasted for months.

President Abdelaziz Bouteflika's government claimed that the real name of Massinissa was in fact Karim and that he was a jobless criminal aged 26. Several months after these statements, the government admitted that his real name was in fact Massinissa (named after the historical Berber king of ancient Algeria), and that he was an innocent high school student. The Minister of the Interior Yazid Zerhouni said that he "was badly informed". No apologies were given to the victim's family, however, and the riots did not stop. Bouteflika's government maintained that the Kabyles were being "manipulated by a foreign hand".

A march that brought many tens of thousands of Kabyles into the capital, Algiers, was organized by the Arouch movement, which along with the autonomist Movement for the Autonomy of Kabylie sprang from the civil activism surrounding the disturbances. The demonstration was followed by confrontations between the local population of Algiers and the demonstrating Kabyles. The police sided with the "Algérois" and state television thanked "les Algérois for having defended their town from the invaders". Since then, public marches in Algiers are prohibited.

Victims

As of April 2001 (few days after the beginning of the black spring) there were 43 young Kabyles killed. As of July 2001, there were 267 young people shot by bullets, of which 50 died (18,7%). The Issad commission notes that "It is only comparable to military losses in very tough battles during war time, The security forces, at the same time and at the same place do not present any wounded man by bullets, nor anyone killed by bullets."

As of April 2002, the Algerian Human Rights League reports 126 Kabyles killed, 5000 wounded of which 200 have become permanently disabled, and thousands of arrests, bad treatment, torture and arbitrary detentions.

At the end of the Black Spring events, the Algerian press reported 126 Kabyles were killed, and thousands were severely injured in the riots, or tortured by the Gendarmerie paramilitaries.

Results
In the end, Bouteflika agreed to some of the Kabyle demands. Gendarmes were withdrawn from Kabylie, and the Berber language (Tamazight) was made a "national language" in the 2002 Algerian Constitution (but not an "official" language, on par with Arabic, until 2016). 

The traditional Berber political parties, Saïd Sadi's liberal Rally for Culture and Democracy (RCD) and Hocine Aït Ahmed's socialist Front of Socialist Forces (FFS), were partly marginalized by the radical grass-roots activism and violent forms of protest. Instead, new movements rose to the fore in Kabyle politics: the Arush (Arouch) movement and the Movement for the Autonomy of Kabylie (MAK), whose regionalist ambitions for autonomy marked a new evolution in Kabyle politics.

The region of Barbacha has managed to gain a significant degree of autonomy, giving hope to many Kabylie activists.

See also
List of modern conflicts in North Africa

References

External links
Algerian Human Rights League report
The report of Issad's Commission Report, established by The president Bouteflika
Black Spring’s Martyrs list

2001 in Algeria
2002 in Algeria
Berberism in Algeria
Kabylie
Opposition to Arab nationalism
Protests in Algeria
2001 protests
2002 protests